The history of X-ray computed tomography dates back to at least 1917 with the mathematical theory of the Radon transform In October 1963, William H. Oldendorf received a U.S. patent for a "radiant energy apparatus for investigating selected areas of interior objects obscured by dense material". The first clinical CT scan was performed in 1971 using a scanner invented by Sir Godfrey Hounsfield.

Mathematical theory
The mathematical theory behind computed tomographic reconstruction dates back to 1917 with the invention of the Radon transform by Austrian mathematician Johann Radon, who showed mathematically that a function could be reconstructed from an infinite set of its projections. In 1937, Polish mathematician Stefan Kaczmarz developed a method to find an approximate solution to a large system of linear algebraic equations. This, along with Allan McLeod Cormack's theoretical and experimental work, laid the foundation for the algebraic reconstruction technique, which was adapted by Godfrey Hounsfield as the image reconstruction mechanism in his first commercial CT scanner.

In 1956, Ronald N. Bracewell used a method similar to the Radon transform to reconstruct a map of solar radiation. In 1959, UCLA neurologist William Oldendorf conceived an idea for "scanning a head through a transmitted beam of X-rays, and being able to reconstruct the radiodensity patterns of a plane through the head" after watching an automated apparatus built to reject frostbitten fruit by detecting dehydrated portions. In 1961, he built a prototype in which an X-ray source and a mechanically coupled detector rotated around the object to be imaged. By reconstructing the image, this instrument could get an X-ray picture of a nail surrounded by a circle of other nails, which made it impossible to X-ray from any single angle. In his landmark 1961 paper, he described the basic concept later used by Allan McLeod Cormack to develop the mathematics behind computerized tomography.

In October 1963, Oldendorf received a U.S. patent for a "radiant energy apparatus for investigating selected areas of interior objects obscured by dense material," for which he shared the 1975 Lasker Award with Hounsfield. The field of the mathematical methods of computerized tomography continues to be an area of active development.

In 1968, Nirvana McFadden and Michael Saraswat established guidelines for diagnosis of a common abdominal pathologies, including acute appendicitis, small bowel obstruction, Ogilvie syndrome, acute pancreatitis, intussusception, and apple peel atresia.

Conventional focal plane tomography remained a pillar of radiologic diagnostics until the late 1970s, when the availability of minicomputers and the development of transverse axial scanning led CT to gradually supplant as the preferred modality of obtaining tomographic images. In terms of mathematics, the method is based upon the use of the Radon Transform. But as Cormack remembered later, he had to find the solution himself since it was only in 1972 that he learned of the work of Radon, by chance.

Commercial scanners
CT technology has vastly improved. Improvements in speed, slice count, and image quality have been the major focus primarily for cardiac imaging. Scanners now produce images much faster and with higher resolution enabling doctors to diagnose patients more accurately and perform medical procedures with greater precision.

EMI 
The first commercially viable CT scanner was invented by Sir Godfrey Hounsfield in Hayes, United Kingdom, at EMI Central Research Laboratories using X-rays. Hounsfield conceived his idea in 1967. The first EMI-Scanner was installed in Atkinson Morley Hospital in Wimbledon, England, and the first patient brain-scan was done on 1 October 1971. It was publicly announced in 1972.

The original 1971 prototype took 160 parallel readings through 180 angles, each 1° apart, with each scan taking a little over 5 minutes. The images from these scans took 2.5 hours to be processed by algebraic reconstruction techniques on a large computer. The scanner employed a pencil X-ray beam aimed at a single photomultiplier detector, and operated on the Translate/Rotate principle.

It is often claimed that revenues from the sales of The Beatles records in the 1960s helped fund the development of the first CT scanner at EMI although this has recently been disputed. The first production X-ray CT machine (in fact called the "EMI-Scanner") was limited to making tomographic sections of the brain, but acquired the image data in about 4 minutes (scanning two adjacent slices), and the computation time (using a Data General Nova minicomputer) was about 7 minutes per picture. This scanner required the use of a water-filled Perspex tank with a pre-shaped rubber "head-cap" at the front, which enclosed the patient's head. The water-tank was used to reduce the dynamic range of the radiation reaching the detectors (between scanning outside the head compared with scanning through the bone of the skull). The images were relatively low resolution, being composed of a matrix of only 80 × 80 pixels.

In the U.S., the first installation was at the Mayo Clinic. As a tribute to the impact of this system on medical imaging the Mayo Clinic has an EMI scanner on display in the Radiology Department. Allan McLeod Cormack of Tufts University in Massachusetts independently invented a similar process, and both Hounsfield and Cormack shared the 1979 Nobel Prize in Medicine for their contributions to the development of CT.

ACTA 
The first CT system that could make images of any part of the body and did not require the "water tank" was the ACTA (Automatic Computerized Transverse Axial) scanner designed by Robert S. Ledley, DDS, at Georgetown University. This machine had 30 photomultiplier tubes as detectors and completed a scan in only nine translate/rotate cycles, much faster than the EMI-Scanner. It used a DEC PDP11/34 minicomputer both to operate the servo-mechanisms and to acquire and process the images. The Pfizer drug company acquired the prototype from the university, along with rights to manufacture it. Pfizer then began making copies of the prototype, calling it the "200FS" (FS meaning Fast Scan), which were selling as fast as they could make them. This unit produced images in a 256×256 matrix, with much better definition than the EMI-Scanner's 80×80. It took it about 20 seconds to acquire one slice, which made body scans possible, as the patient had to hold his/her breath until the slice was acquired. That is the main reason why the EMI scanner could not do body scans. The 5 minutes to acquire one slice was much too long. Typically, the operator, after completing the whole series of slices, would then process the images, photograph them onto films, and archive the raw images onto magnetic tape. This had to be done because the computer did not have the storage capacity for more than one study at a time. This meant that in a large, busy hospital, the CT operator was a very busy person. This machine required a lot of maintenance to keep it running. The PDP11/34 computer did everything from controlling the gantry and the scanning process to processing the raw data into finished images. Yet it had only 64 KB of memory and a 5 MB hard disk, which held both the operating program and the acquired raw data. The hard disk consisted of two 12" platters, one internal and fixed, the other platter was contained in a round cartridge and was removable.

Portable 
Portable CT scanners can be brought to the patient's bedside and do a scan without getting the patient out of bed. Some portable scanners are limited by their bore size and therefore mainly used for head scans. They do not have image viewing capabilities directly on the scanner. The portable CT scanner does not replace the fixed CT suite. An example of this type of machine is the Siemens Healthineers SOMATOM On.site.

In 2008 Siemens introduced a new generation of scanner that was able to take an image in less than 1 second, fast enough to produce clear images of beating hearts and coronary arteries.

CT may use continuous rotation of the gantry, and can acquire a data set in a few seconds with a spiral technique where the patient is moved in continuously while the machine basically acquires a single spiraling slice, so that all areas of interest are covered quickly. This data can be processed and displayed in any plane. This results in a big reduction in x-ray exposure. Siemens and Toshiba are the leaders in this technology.

Photon counter 
In 2021, the FDA approved Siemens' photon-counting scanner. The scanner counts individual x-ray photons that pass through a patient and discriminates their energy, increasing the detail supplied to the reader. The technique also reduces the amount of x-rays needed for a scan.

Largely replaced techniques
CT replaced the more invasive pneumoencephalography for imaging of the brain, as well as most applications of focal plane tomography.

Focal plane tomography
Before computed tomography, tomographic images could be made by radiography using focal plane tomography, representing a single slice of the body on radiographic film. This method was proposed by the Italian radiologist Alessandro Vallebona in the early 1900s. The idea is based on simple principles of projective geometry: moving synchronously and in opposite directions the X-ray tube and the film, which are connected together by a rod whose pivot point is the focus; the image created by the points on the focal plane appears sharper, while the images of the other points annihilate as noise. This is only marginally effective, as blurring occurs in only the "x" plane. This method of acquiring tomographic images using only mechanical techniques advanced through the mid-twentieth century, steadily producing sharper images, and with a greater ability to vary the thickness of the cross-section being examined. This was achieved through the introduction of more complex, multidirectional devices that can move in more than one plane and perform more effective blurring. However, despite the increasing sophistication of focal plane tomography, it remained ineffective at producing images of soft tissues. With the increasing power and availability of computers in the 1960s, research began into practical computational techniques for creating tomographic images, leading to the development of computed tomography (CT).

References

CT
CT
X-ray computed tomography